Casmier Valentine "Kayo" Wnorowski (October 4, 1921 – April 15, 1998) was an American professional basketball player. He played for the Denver Nuggets in the National Basketball League during the 1948–49 season and averaged 1.6 points per game.

References

1921 births
1998 deaths
United States Army personnel of World War II
American men's basketball players
American people of Polish descent
Basketball players from New York (state)
Denver Nuggets (1948–1950) players
Guards (basketball)
Siena Saints men's basketball players
Sportspeople from Schenectady, New York